Chelsea Peretti (born February 20, 1978) is an American comedian, actress, television writer, singer, and songwriter. She is best known for portraying Gina Linetti in the comedy series Brooklyn Nine-Nine and writing for Parks and Recreation and Saturday Night Live.

Early life and education
Peretti was born on February 20, 1978, in Oakland, California, to Amanda Cherkin, a schoolteacher, and Gene Peretti, a criminal defense lawyer and painter. Her father is of Italian and English descent, and her mother is Jewish. Her step-mother was African-American. She was raised in Oakland, California. She has an older brother, internet entrepreneur Jonah Peretti, co-founder of BuzzFeed and The Huffington Post. Chelsea Peretti attended The College Preparatory School in Oakland. She moved to New York City in 1996 to attend Barnard College, during which time (in her junior year) she took a study year abroad to Royal Holloway, University of London. She graduated in 2000. She attended elementary school with her Brooklyn Nine-Nine co-star Andy Samberg and junior high school with comedian Moshe Kasher.

Career

Writing 
Peretti has written for The Village Voice, Details, Playgirl, Jest, and American Theatre Magazine, as well as online publications including The Huffington Post.

Television 
After moving to Los Angeles, Peretti made appearances on programs such as Kroll Show, Louie, The Sarah Silverman Program, TruTV Presents: World's Dumbest..., and Tosh.0. She appeared as a guest correspondent on one episode of Lopez Tonight, interviewing local citizens about Prop 8.

Peretti is credited as a story editor on the fourth season of Parks and Recreation from 2011 to 2012.

From 2013 until 2019, Peretti was a series regular on NBC's detective/police comedy Brooklyn Nine-Nine, playing Gina Linetti, until she announced her departure from the show in October 2018. Her departure episode was "Four Movements." She returned later in the season in a guest appearance, in "Return of the King," which premiered May 2, 2019. She also returned for the two part finale.

In other media 
While in New York, Peretti made short films with Variety SHAC, a comedy troupe she formed in 2004 with Andrea Rosen, Heather Lawless, and Shonali Bhowmik.

She has made several guest appearances on podcasts, including Doug Loves Movies, How Did This Get Made?, WTF with Marc Maron, You Made It Weird with Pete Holmes, The Todd Glass Show, The Lavender Hour, The Bone Zone with Brendon Walsh and Randy Liedtke, and Comedy Bang! Bang! In October 2012, Peretti launched her own call-in podcast, Call Chelsea Peretti.

In July 2010, Peretti made Variety magazine's "Ten Comics to Watch in 2010" list. Paste ranked her Twitter account #75 on "The 75 Best Twitter Accounts of 2014."

On April 21, 2020, Peretti released an EP titled Foam and Flotsam, a musical comedy concept album about coffee. She created the music in collaboration with Kool Kojak, and the songs feature guests Reggie Watts, Terry Crews, and Juliette Lewis. In tandem with the EP, Peretti also released two accompanying music videos: "Late" and "Oatmilk." Her music style is described as "whimsical yet depressive...[slamming] you into a wall and then [sliding] you up that wall and [releasing] you into a new galaxy."

Personal life
Peretti began dating comedian and filmmaker Jordan Peele in 2013. They got engaged in November 2015. On April 26, 2016, Peretti announced that she and Peele had eloped. They have a son, Beaumont Gino, who was born in 2017.

Filmography

Film

Television

Web

Video games

Discography

Studio albums
TBA (Released: Fall 2020 )

Extended plays

Awards and nominations

References

External links

 
 
 Official Tumblr page for the Call Chelsea Peretti podcast
 Chelsea Peretti Biography

1978 births
Living people
21st-century American actresses
21st-century American comedians
21st-century American women writers
Actresses from Oakland, California
American film actresses
American models
American people of English descent
American people of Jewish descent
American stand-up comedians
American television actresses
American television writers
American voice actresses
American writers of Italian descent
American women comedians
American women podcasters
American podcasters
Barnard College alumni
Comedians from California
American women television writers
Writers from Oakland, California
Screenwriters from California
21st-century American screenwriters
American Conservatory Theater alumni